Florence Lepron (born 16 January 1985) is a French professional basketball player. She plays for France women's national basketball team. She has competed in the 2012 Summer Olympics where France won the silver medal.

References

1985 births
Living people
French women's basketball players
Olympic basketball players of France
Basketball players at the 2012 Summer Olympics
Olympic medalists in basketball
Olympic silver medalists for France
Medalists at the 2012 Summer Olympics
Knights of the Ordre national du Mérite
Sportspeople from Nantes